Jørn Sandnes (3 May 1926 – 12 April 2007) was a Norwegian historian. He was born in Snåsa in Nord-Trøndelag. He was appointed Professor in Trondheim from 1975 to 1992, From 1984 he served as the first rector at the University of Trondheim. Among his works is Norsk Stadnamnleksikon from 1976 (jointly with Ola Stemshaug), and Avfolking og union, volume four of Cappelens Norgeshistorie from 1977. He was the principal editor of the six volumes of Trondheims historie from 1997.

Sandnes was the younger brother of politician Arne Sandnes.

References

1926 births
2007 deaths
People from Snåsa
20th-century Norwegian historians
Academic staff of the Norwegian University of Science and Technology
Rectors of universities and colleges in Norway